The Church of Saints Cosmas and Damian in Old Panei, is a Russian Orthodox church dedicated to the twin Saints Cosmas and Damian, Christian martyrs of the 4th century.

It is located in the Kitay-gorod, in Moscow, Russia. In the 16th-17th century. Since 1508 it was a location of the Polish diplomatic mission in Russia, since that time this place called Pany or Stary Pany.

See also
Saints Cosmas and Damian

References
 Palamarchuk, Petr. Moscow in boarders of Garden ring. Moscow, 2004, ( (т.2))()

External links

 St Cosmas And St Damian Churchs on pravoslavie.ru
 St Cosmas And St Damian Church in Old Panei on hramy.ru
 St Cosmas And St Damian Church in Old Panei
 St Cosmas And St Damian on sobory.ru

Cosmas
Cosmas
Cultural heritage monuments of federal significance in Moscow